Pan de Azúcar Formation (Sugar-loaf formation) is a geologic formation of Hettangian–Sinemurian (Jurassic) age made up of chiefly by sandstone, tuff, mudstone and limestone. The formation is located in the Coast Range of northern Chile. The formation interdigitates and is coeval with the Posada de los Hidalgo Formation. It concordantly overlies the Cifuncho Formation and is overlain by the La Negra Formation.

At least one location the formation is intruded by a roughly coeval dacite dyke which adds to the evidence that the formation was coeval with the early stages of "Andean" volcanism.

References 

Geologic formations of Chile
Early Jurassic South America
Jurassic System of South America
Jurassic Chile
Hettangian Stage
Sinemurian Stage
Sandstone formations
Limestone formations
Mudstone formations
Tuff formations
Geology of the Chilean Coast Range
Geology of Antofagasta Region